Meinich is a surname. Notable people with the surname include:

Jørgen Meinich (1820–1911), Norwegian jurist and industrialist
Per Meinich (1931–2009), Norwegian economist

See also
Minich